The Uruguay Assembly (Asamblea Uruguay) is a social-democratic political party in Uruguay. It is a member organisation of the Broad Front. Its leader is the senator and former economy minister of Uruguay, Danilo Astori.
Nowadays it forms part of the Liber Seregni Front.

History 
Uruguay Assembly was founded in 1994 by Danilo Astori. It is part of the left-leaning Broad Front coalition but is considered more of a moderate party.

Members 
Danilo Astori
Alberto Cid
Enrique Pintado
Carlos Baraibar
Jorge Orrico

Jota21
Jota21: Jóvenes Organizados Trabajando en Asamblea (Organised Youth Working in Assembly) is the youth sector of Asamblea Uruguay.

Electoral history

Presidential elections 
Due to its membership in the Broad Front, the party has endorsed the candidates of other parties on several occasions. Presidential elections in Uruguay are held using a two-round system, the results of which are displayed below.

See also 
Broad Front (Uruguay)

References

External links
Official web site

1994 establishments in Uruguay
Broad Front (Uruguay)
Political parties established in 1994
Political parties in Uruguay
Political party factions in Uruguay
Social democratic parties in Uruguay